Austranoplium concolor is a species of beetle in the family Cerambycidae, the only species in the genus Austranoplium.

References

Hesperophanini